Minuscule 225 (in the Gregory-Aland numbering), ε 1210 (Soden), is a Greek minuscule manuscript of the New Testament, on parchment. It is dated by a colophon to the year 1192. It was adapted for liturgical use.

Description 

The codex contains a complete text of the four Gospels, on 171 parchment leaves (size ). The text is written in one column per page, 29 lines per page.

It contains pictures, lectionary markings at the margin, lessons, synaxaria, and Menologion. 

The Pericope Adulterae (John 7:53-8:11) is placed after John 7:36.

Text 

The Greek text of this codex is a representative of the Byzantine text-type. According to Hermann von Soden it represents the Antiocheian commentated text. Kurt Aland did not placed it in any Category.

According to the Claremont Profile Method it has mixed Byzantine text in Luke 1. In Luke 10 and Luke 20 it belongs to the textual group 1167.

In Matthew 6:13 it has an unusual ending of the Lord's Prayer: 
ὅτι σοῦ ἐστιν ἡ βασιλεία καὶ ἡ δύναμις καὶ ἡ δόξα, τοῦ πατρὸς καὶ τοῦ υἱοῦ καὶ τοῦ ἁγίου πνεύματος εἰς τοὺς αἰῶνας. ἀμήν (For thine is the kingdom and the power and the glory, of the Father and of the Son and of the Holy Spirit for ever. Amen.)
This ending have only two other manuscripts: 157 and 418.

In John 8:10 it reads Ιησους ειδεν αυτην και along with Codex Nanianus, Codex Tischendorfianus III, f13, 700, 1077, 1443, Lectionary 185mg, Ethiopic mss. Majority of the manuscripts read: Ιησους και μηδενα θεασαμενος πλην της γυναικος or: Ιησους.

History 

The manuscript was examined by Treschow and Alter. Alter used it in his edition of the Greek text of the New Testament. C. R. Gregory saw it in 1887.

Formerly it was held at Vienna at the Imperial Library (Suppl. Gr. 102). 

It is currently housed at the Biblioteca Nazionale (Cod. Neapol. ex Vind. 9), at Naples.

See also 

 List of New Testament minuscules
 Biblical manuscript
 Textual criticism

References

Further reading 

 F. K. Alter, Novum Testamentum Graecum, ad Codicem Vindobonensem Graece expressum: Varietam Lectionis addidit Franciscus Carolus Alter, 2 vols. 8vo, Vienna, 1786-1787.

External links 

 Minuscule 225 at the Encyclopedia of Textual Criticism

Greek New Testament minuscules
12th-century biblical manuscripts